Asphondylia ambrosiae is a species of gall midge in the family Cecidomyiidae.

References

Further reading

 
 

Cecidomyiinae
Articles created by Qbugbot
Insects described in 1975
Diptera of North America
Taxa named by Raymond J. Gagne
Gall-inducing insects